The American Composers Forum is an American organization that works for the promotion and assistance of American composers and contemporary classical music. It was founded in 1973 as the Minnesota Composers Forum and is based in Saint Paul, Minnesota. As of 2000 it was the largest composer-service organization in the country. The chief executive of the Forum is Vanessa Rose.

History
The Forum was founded as the Minnesota Composers Forum in 1973 by a group of University of Minnesota graduate students — including Libby Larsen and Stephen Paulus — with a $400 grant from the University’s Student Club Activities Fund. In 1996, the organization changed its name to the American Composers Forum, and established chapters in New York City, Boston, Massachusetts, Philadelphia, Washington, D.C., Atlanta, Chicago, San Francisco, and Los Angeles, California. The group currently acts as a national umbrella organization for locally funded chapters in Minnesota (based in Saint Paul), Philadelphia and the San Francisco Bay Area, in addition to volunteer-led chapters in New York City and Los Angeles. In 2007 the group, along with the American Music Center, extended membership to current composition students attending six affiliated academic institutions: Indiana University's Jacobs School of Music, the New England Conservatory, the San Francisco Conservatory, the University of Michigan in Ann Arbor, and Yale University. The Forum's annual budget for fiscal year 2019 was $1.6 million.
Music for Homeschoolers: A Guide to Music Instruction for the Homeschooled Child, p.53. .</ref> in all 50 states, Canada, and several other countries.

Forum members pay annual dues that are used to fund networking and informational services, such as the Forum's website and bimonthly newsletter, Sounding Board. The Forum also funds national and local commissioning projects, as well as offers programs for individual composers and performers of new music.  These projects and programs are funded by grants from government agencies, corporate and private foundations, and individual contributions.

Current Forum programs include Continental Harmony, a national, community-based commissioning program; Faith Partners, a residency program that pairs multiple communities of faith with a composer of their choice; BandQuest, a program that supports the creation of new work for middle-level concert bands by contemporary composers such as Michael Colgrass, Michael Daugherty, Jennifer Higdon, Tania Léon, and Gunther Schuller; Composers Datebook, a daily two-minute radio program looking at contemporary composers in the context of classical music history; and Innova Recordings, a compact disc label that issues more than two dozen releases of new music each year. In co-operation with the American Music Center and the Minnesota Orchestra, the Forum also offers an annual Minnesota Orchestra Composer Institute, a week-long series of professional workshops and career seminars for new composers, culminating in a public concert of their works performed by the Minnesota Orchestra and its music director, Osmo Vänskä, at Orchestra Hall in Minneapolis.

First Nations Composer Initiative
In 2006 the Forum launched, with the Ford Foundation, the First Nations Composer Initiative (FNCI), an organization working to promote new music by Native American composers. Based in Saint Paul, the program aims to establish a national infrastructure for American Indian composers and performers, and promote the  artists in both Native and non-Native communities.

Its program director is Georgia Wettlin-Larsen, and its advisors include Louis W. Ballard (deceased), Sharon Burch, Raven Chacon, Brent Michael Davids, Joy Harjo, Jennifer E. Kreisberg, R. Carlos Nakai, Joanne Shenandoah, Dawn Avery, and Jerod Impichchaachaaha' Tate.

The organization sponsors the Composer Apprentice National Outreach Endeavor (CANOE), which teaches American Indian young people to compose their own concert music. It also supported the North American Indian Cello Project commissioning and supporting performances of composers including, Brent Michael Davids, Raven Chacon, Tim Archambault, Ron Warren, R. Carlos Nakai, Dawn Avery, Louis W. Ballard, and Tio Becenti.

See also
American Composers Alliance
American Composers Orchestra
Native American Composers Apprenticeship Project
Native American music

References

Classical music in the United States
Organizations established in 1973
 
Music organizations based in the United States
Native American arts organizations
1973 establishments in Minnesota